Ashraf Mohamed El-Meligy El-Gharably (born January 14, 1979) is an amateur Egyptian Greco-Roman wrestler, who played for the men's lightweight category. He is a two-time All-Africa Games gold medalist, a three-time Olympian, and a multiple-time African wrestling champion. He also captured a bronze medal at the 2001 Mediterranean Games in Tunis, Tunisia, and eventually defeated Serbia and Montenegro's Davor Štefanek for the gold at the 2005 Mediterranean Games in Almería, Spain.

El-Gharably made his official debut for the 2004 Summer Olympics in Athens, where he placed second in the preliminary pool of the men's 60 kg class, against Bulgaria's Armen Nazaryan and Ukraine's Oleksandr Khvoshch.

At the 2008 Summer Olympics in Beijing, El-Gharably competed for the second time in the men's 60 kg class. He lost the qualifying round match by a superiority decision to Romania's Eusebiu Diaconu, after the pair had tied 3–3.

At the 2012 Summer Olympics in London, El-Gharably switched to a heavier category by competing in the men's welterweight class (66 kg). He first defeated Ecuador's Orlando Huacón in the preliminary round of sixteen, before losing out the quarterfinal match to Georgian wrestler Manuchar Tskhadaia, who was able to score six points in two straight periods, leaving El-Gharably without a single point.

References

External links
Profile – International Wrestling Database
NBC Olympics Profile

1979 births
Living people
Olympic wrestlers of Egypt
Wrestlers at the 2004 Summer Olympics
Wrestlers at the 2008 Summer Olympics
Wrestlers at the 2012 Summer Olympics
People from Monufia Governorate
Egyptian male sport wrestlers
Mediterranean Games gold medalists for Egypt
Mediterranean Games bronze medalists for Egypt
Competitors at the 2001 Mediterranean Games
Competitors at the 2005 Mediterranean Games
Mediterranean Games medalists in wrestling
20th-century Egyptian people
21st-century Egyptian people